Southern League may refer to:

Professional baseball leagues in the United States

Southern League (1964–present), active since 1964
Southern Association, known as the "Southern League", active from 1901 to 1919
Southern League (1885–1899), active from 1885 to 1899

Other
Southern League (New Zealand), a semi-professional football league in New Zealand
Southern Football League, a semi-professional football league in England currently known as the PitchingIn Southern League
Southern League (ice hockey), a former top-flight ice hockey league in southern England from 1970 to 1978
Southern League (1929–31), one of two British speedway leagues from 1929 to 1931
Southern League (1952–53), a British speedway competition

See also
Southern Football League (disambiguation)
League of the South, a United States Southern nationalist organization, formerly known as the Southern League
Southern League Ausonia, an Italian political party based in Campania
Southern Leagues, the various tournaments for association football, cricket, field hockey, in the South Island of New Zealand
Ligue du Sud, a Provençal regionalist and far-right French political party, founded by Jacques Bompard